Goldi Sporting Club is an Egyptian football club based in Cairo. It was founded in 1994 under the name El-Maaden, and was changed to the current name in 2001.

Achievements
 Egyptian League Cup
Third place (1): 2000

Managers
 Mohamed Salah (1999–2001)
 Anwar Salama (2002)
 Mohamed Aboel Azz (2002)
 Mohamed Salah (2002–2003)
 Ibrahim Said (2016)
 Fayza Rahim (2021-)

References

External links
 Facebook

Football clubs in Egypt
Football clubs in Cairo
1994 establishments in Egypt
Sports clubs in Egypt